Klukowski is a Polish masculine surname, its feminine counterpart is Klukowska. It may refer to

Józef Klukowski (1894–1944), Polish sculptor
Józef Klukowski (swimmer) (born 1946), Polish swimmer
Kenneth Klukowski, American legal counsel
Michael Klukowski (born 1981), Canadian professional soccer player
Yan Klukowski (born 1987), English professional footballer
Zygmunt Klukowski (1885–1959), Polish physician

Polish-language surnames